Brigadier-General Henry Tempest Hicks  (25 November 1852 – 10 November 1922) was a British Army officer who served in the South African War and was mentioned in despatches three times and subsequently made a Companion of the Order of the Bath. He later served in Aden.

Early life
Tempest Hicks was born in 1852, the son of George H. Tempest Hicks of Hillgrove, Wells. He was educated at Harrow School and the University of Cambridge.

Military career
Tempest Hicks served in the South African War in command of the 2nd Royal Dublin Fusiliers. He was mentioned in despatches three times and subsequently made a Companion of the Order of the Bath. He later served in Aden. He reached the rank of brigadier general. In 1907, Hicks's address was given as Gladsmuir, Monken Hadley.

Family
Hicks married in 1885 Anna Clara Georgina Hemery, daughter of Charles Hemery of Monken Hadley. The couple had children Captain Charles Edward Henry Tempest-Hicks, who died in action 1918, and Anne Monica Georgiana Tempest-Hicks, who married Thomas Hall Rokeby Plumer, 2nd Viscount Plumer, son of Field Marshal Herbert Charles Onslow Plumer, 1st Viscount Plumer, in 1919. Anne died 2 May 1963.

References

External links
http://www.thepeerage.com/p24072.htm
http://family-tree.cobboldfht.com/tree/view/person:8438
http://www.npg.org.uk/collections/search/person/mp61994/anne-monica-georgiana-plumer-nee-tempest-hicks-viscountess-plumer
http://www.gutenberg.org/files/25618/25618-h/25618-h.htm

British Army generals of World War I
Royal Dublin Fusiliers officers
1852 births
1922 deaths
People from Wells, Somerset
Alumni of Trinity College, Cambridge
People educated at Harrow School
Companions of the Order of the Bath
British Army personnel of the Second Boer War
Military personnel from London
British Army brigadiers